Andrei Sopin (born July 7, 1997) is a Russian professional basketball player, who plays in the senior Russia national basketball team.

Russian national team
Sopin was a member of the Russian junior national teams. With Russia's junior national teams, he played at the 2013 FIBA Europe Under-16 Championship, the FIBA U18 European Championship, and the 2017 FIBA U20 European Championship.

Sopin is a member of the senior Russian national basketball team, with Russia's senior men team, he played at the 2019 FIBA Basketball World Cup where he averaged 2.3 points, 0.3 rebounds and 1 assists per game.

References

1997 births
Living people
Point guards
Russian men's basketball players
Basketball players from Moscow
2019 FIBA Basketball World Cup players